The Mayor of Upper Hutt is the head of the municipal government of Upper Hutt, New Zealand, and presides over the Upper Hutt City Council. The mayor is directly elected using a First Past the Post electoral system. The Upper Hutt Town Board had seven chairmen, with the role regarded as the predecessor role of mayor. The Upper Hutt Borough Council was proclaimed in 1926, and with that, the role of mayor was introduced. In 1966, Upper Hutt became a city council.  The current mayor, Wayne Guppy, is the eleventh since the role was created in 1926, and he was first elected in 2001.

History

Local government in Upper Hutt commenced with the formation of a Roads Board, which was subsequently incorporated into the Hutt County Council when that body was established in 1876. The road board evolved into a dependent county town board within the County Council's jurisdiction. After a change in local government legislation, the Upper Hutt Town Board was proclaimed in 1908. In 1965, Upper Hutt qualified as a city, and this status was officially conferred in the following year, with Upper Hutt becoming a city council. In 1973, the Hutt County Council, Rimutaka, and parts of Heretaunga Ridings were amalgamated with Upper Hutt, which thus became the second largest council by area (after Dunedin City Council). Further amalgamation happened in 1989, when Heretaunga/Pinehaven District Community Council was incorporated into Upper Hutt.

The seventh and last chairman of the town board, Angus McCurdy, was elected as the first mayor of the Upper Hutt Borough Council, which was formed in 1926. Peter Robertson was chairman during the years of World War I, and mayor from 1927 to 1931, and again in 1938 until his death in 1939. He died from injuries received in a car crash, colliding with the car of the son of Councillor James Blewman. The resulting by-election was won by Blewman, who beat J Purvis by a majority of 193 votes.

Doris Nicholson was mayor from 1971 to 1977. She has been the only woman so far to hold the mayoralty. She was succeeded by Rex Kirton, who was mayor for 24 years until 2001 and by the time of his retirement from the role, he was New Zealand's longest-serving mayor at that time. He was succeeded by one-term councillor Wayne Guppy, who was elected with a 6,000 vote majority and who has held the mayoralty since then.

Unusual for a city in New Zealand, none of the chairmen or mayors of Upper Hutt has been a Member of Parliament.

Until 2004, First Past the Post (FPP) was the electoral system used for New Zealand local elections (with few historic exceptions) including in Upper Hutt. The option of using the Single transferable vote voting system was introduced in 2004, but Upper Hutt continues to use FPP.

Chairmen and mayors

Upper Hutt Town Board Chairmen
The Upper Hutt Town Board had seven chairmen between 1908 and 1926.

Upper Hutt Borough Council

The Upper Hutt Borough Council had eight mayors between 1926 and 1966.

Upper Hutt City Council
The Upper Hutt City Council has had an additional four mayors since its formation in 1966. The last mayor of the borough council was also the first mayor of the city council.

References
 

Upper Hutt
People from Upper Hutt
Upper Hutt